The Fort Garry Historical Society was a non-profit organization formed in 1971 and folded in 2016, it mandate was to foster the preservation of heritage sites in St. Norbert and Fort Garry in Winnipeg, Manitoba, Canada.

The museum is affiliated with CMA, CHIN, and Virtual Museum of Canada.

Heritage sites
One of historical society's primary heritage sites is the St. Norbert Provincial Heritage Park, a  park with 14 interpretive plaques about the cultural history and development of the community. The plaques form a self-guiding tour along the La Salle and Red River, ending at the historic junction of the two rivers, which faces the floodway bridge and gates.

The site also features two restored historic house museums, the Turenne and Bohémier homes, which feature late 19th century furnishings. The houses are also known as the Fort Garry Historical Society Museum. The houses are open in the summer season.

The house owned by Pierre Delorme, a prominent Métis politician, is also located in the park, but has not been restored.

Henderson House built in 1854 and originally at 2112 Henderson Highway in North Kildonan is also in the park and it was moved to a site next to the Delorme House in 1979. It has not been restored but the North East Winnipeg Historical Society has plans to restore the house and hopefully move it back to North Kildonan.

External links

Fort Garry Historical Society - Town of Fort Garry site
St. Norbert Provincial Park - Manitoba Conservation Department

Historic house museums in Manitoba
Museums in Winnipeg
Historical societies of Canada
Historical_Society
St. Norbert, Winnipeg